Yi Gwang-sik (Gangneung, 29 September 1493 – Seoul, 1 December 1563), was a Korean politician and general during the Joseon Dynasty. He was famed for his victories against the Japanese navy during the Eulmyowaebyeon (을묘왜변) war of 1555 .

In 1543 he was given the title of Naval Commander (병마절도사) of Pyongan Province.

References

External links 
 강원의 인물-이광식 
 이광식:여주군사 
 Yi Gwang-sik:Nate 

1493 births
1563 deaths
16th-century Korean writers